"Boom Boom (Heartbeat)" is a song by British DJ Ray Foxx featuring vocals from Welsh singer Rachel K Collier. It peaked at No. 12 on the UK Singles Chart, number 2 on the UK Dance Chart and number 13 on the Scottish Singles Chart.

Music video
A music video to accompany the release of "Boom Boom (Heartbeat)" was first released onto YouTube on 5 July 2013 at a total length of three minutes and nineteen seconds. The video was directed by Tom Paton.

Track listing

Chart performance

Release history

References

2013 singles
2013 songs
Ray Foxx songs
Rachel K Collier songs
Island Records singles